The Anthropocene is a proposed geological epoch dating from the commencement of significant human impact on Earth's geology and ecosystems, including, but not limited to, anthropogenic climate change.

, neither the International Commission on Stratigraphy (ICS) nor the International Union of Geological Sciences (IUGS) has officially approved the term as a recognised subdivision of geologic time, although the Anthropocene Working Group (AWG) of the Subcommission on Quaternary Stratigraphy (SQS) of the ICS voted in April 2016 to proceed towards a formal golden spike (GSSP) proposal to define the Anthropocene epoch in the geologic time scale (GTS) and presented the recommendation to the International Geological Congress in August 2016. In May 2019, the AWG voted in favour of submitting a formal proposal to the ICS by 2021, locating potential stratigraphic markers to the mid-twentieth century of the common era. This time period coincides with the start of the Great Acceleration, a post-WWII time period during which socioeconomic and Earth system trends increase at a dramatic rate, and the Atomic Age.

Various start dates for the Anthropocene have been proposed, ranging from the beginning of the Agricultural Revolution 12,000–15,000 years ago, to as recently as the 1960s. The ratification process is still ongoing, and thus a date remains to be decided definitively, but the peak in radionuclides fallout consequential to atomic bomb testing during the 1950s has been more favoured than others, locating a possible beginning of the Anthropocene to the detonation of the first atomic bomb in 1945, or the Partial Nuclear Test Ban Treaty in 1963.

General

An early concept for the Anthropocene was the Noosphere by Vladimir Vernadsky, who in 1938 wrote of "scientific thought as a geological force". Scientists in the Soviet Union appear to have used the term "anthropocene" as early as the 1960s to refer to the Quaternary, the most recent geological period. Ecologist Eugene F. Stoermer subsequently used "anthropocene" with a different sense in the 1980s and the term was widely popularised in 2000 by atmospheric chemist Paul J. Crutzen, who regards the influence of human behavior on Earth's atmosphere in recent centuries as so significant as to constitute a new geological epoch.

In 2008, the Stratigraphy Commission of the Geological Society of London considered a proposal to make the Anthropocene a formal unit of geological epoch divisions. A majority of the commission decided the proposal had merit and should be examined further. Independent working groups of scientists from various geological societies have begun to determine whether the Anthropocene will be formally accepted into the Geological Time Scale.

The term "anthropocene" is informally used in scientific contexts. The Geological Society of America entitled its 2011 annual meeting: Archean to Anthropocene: The past is the key to the future. The new epoch has no agreed start-date, but one proposal, based on atmospheric evidence, is to fix the start with the Industrial Revolution c. 1780, with the invention of the steam engine. Other scientists link the new term to earlier events, such as the rise of agriculture and the Neolithic Revolution (around 12,000 years BP). Evidence of relative human impact – such as the growing human influence on land use, ecosystems, biodiversity, and species extinction – is substantial; scientists think that human impact has significantly changed (or halted) the growth of biodiversity. Those arguing for earlier dates posit that the proposed Anthropocene may have begun as early as 14,000–15,000 years BP, based on geologic evidence; this has led other scientists to suggest that "the onset of the Anthropocene should be extended back many thousand years"; this would make the Anthropocene essentially synonymous with the current term, Holocene.

In January 2015, 26 of the 38 members of the International Anthropocene Working Group published a paper suggesting the Trinity test on 16 July 1945 as the starting point of the proposed new epoch. However, a significant minority supports one of several alternative dates. A March 2015 report suggested either 1610 or 1964 as the beginning of the Anthropocene. Other scholars point to the diachronous character of the physical strata of the Anthropocene, arguing that onset and impact are spread out over time, not reducible to a single instant or date of start.

A January 2016 report on the climatic, biological, and geochemical signatures of human activity in sediments and ice cores suggested the era since the mid-20th century should be recognised as a geological epoch distinct from the Holocene.

The Anthropocene Working Group met in Oslo in April 2016 to consolidate evidence supporting the argument for the Anthropocene as a true geologic epoch. Evidence was evaluated and the group voted to recommend "Anthropocene" as the new geological epoch in August 2016. Should the International Commission on Stratigraphy approve the recommendation, the proposal to adopt the term will have to be ratified by the IUGS before its formal adoption as part of the geologic time scale.

In April 2019, the Anthropocene Working Group (AWG) announced that they would vote on a formal proposal to the International Commission on Stratigraphy, to continue the process started at the 2016 meeting. In May 2019, 29 members of the 34 person AWG panel voted in favour of an official proposal to be made by 2021. The AWG also voted with 29 votes in favour of a starting date in the mid 20th century. Ten candidate sites for a Global boundary Stratotype Section and Point have been identified, one of which will be chosen to be included in the final proposal. Possible markers include microplastics, heavy metals, or the radioactive nuclei left by tests from thermonuclear weapons.

In November 2021, an alternative proposal that the Anthropocene is a geological event, not an epoch, was published and later expanded in 2022. This challenged the assumption underlying the case for the Anthropocene epoch - the idea that it is possible to accurately assign a precise date of start to highly diachronous processes of human-influenced Earth system change. The argument indicated that finding a single GSSP would be impractical, given human-induced changes in the Earth system occurred at different periods, in different places, and spread under different rates. Under this model, the Anthropocene would have many events marking human-induced impacts on the planet, including the mass extinction of large vertebrates, the development of early farming, land clearance in the Americas, global-scale industrial transformation during the Industrial Revolution, and the start of the Atomic Age. The authors are members of the AWG who had voted against the official proposal of a starting date in the mid-20th century, and sought to reconcile some of the previous models (including Ruddiman and Maslin proposals). They cited Crutzen's original concept, arguing that the Anthropocene is much better and more usefully conceived of as an unfolding geological event, like other major transformations in Earth's history such as the Great Oxidation Event.

Etymology
The name Anthropocene is a combination of anthropo- from the Ancient Greek  meaning 'human' and -cene from  meaning 'new' or 'recent'.

As early as 1873, the Italian geologist Antonio Stoppani acknowledged the increasing power and effect of humanity on the Earth's systems and referred to an 'anthropozoic era'.

Although the biologist Eugene F. Stoermer is often credited with coining the term anthropocene, it was in informal use in the mid-1970s. Paul J. Crutzen is credited with independently re-inventing and popularising it. Stoermer wrote, "I began using the term 'anthropocene' in the 1980s, but never formalised it until Paul contacted me." Crutzen has explained, "I was at a conference where someone said something about the Holocene. I suddenly thought this was wrong. The world has changed too much. So I said: 'No, we are in the Anthropocene.' I just made up the word on the spur of the moment. Everyone was shocked. But it seems to have stuck." In 2008, Zalasiewicz suggested in GSA Today that an anthropocene epoch is now appropriate.

Nature of human effects

Homogenocene
Homogenocene (from old Greek: homo-, same; geno-, kind; kainos-, new;) is a more specific term used to define our current epoch, in which biodiversity is diminishing and biogeography and ecosystems around the globe seem more and more similar to one another mainly due to invasive species that have been introduced around the globe either on purpose (crops, livestock) or inadvertently.  This is due to the newfound globalism that humans participate in, as species traveling across the world to another region was not as easily possible in any point of time in history as it is today.

The term Homogenocene was first used by Michael Samways in his editorial article in the Journal of Insect Conservation from 1999 titled "Translocating fauna to foreign lands: Here comes the Homogenocene."

The term was used again by John L. Curnutt in the year 2000 in Ecology, in a short list titled "A Guide to the Homogenocene", which reviewed Alien species in North America and Hawaii: impacts on natural ecosystems by George Cox. Charles C. Mann, in his acclaimed book 1493: Uncovering the New World Columbus Created, gives a bird's-eye view of the mechanisms and ongoing implications of the homogenocene.

Biodiversity

The human impact on biodiversity forms one of the primary attributes of the Anthropocene. Humankind has entered what is sometimes called the Earth's sixth major extinction. Most experts agree that human activities have accelerated the rate of species extinction. The exact rate remains controversial – perhaps 100 to 1000 times the normal background rate of extinction. A 2010 study found thatmarine phytoplankton – the vast range of tiny algae species accounting for roughly half of Earth's total photosynthetic biomass – has declined substantially in the world's oceans over the past century. From 1950 alone, algal biomass decreased by around 40%, probably in response to ocean warming – and that the decline had gathered pace in recent years. Some authors have postulated that without human impacts the biodiversity of the planet would continue to grow at an exponential rate.

Anthropogenic extinctions started as humans migrated out of Africa over 60,000 years ago. Increases in global rates of extinction have been elevated above background rates since at least 1500, and appear to have accelerated in the 19th century and further since. A New York Times op-ed on 13 July 2012 by ecologist Roger Bradbury predicted the end of biodiversity for the oceans, labelling coral reefs doomed: "Coral reefs will be the first, but certainly not the last, major ecosystem to succumb to the Anthropocene." This op-ed quickly generated much discussion among conservationists; The Nature Conservancy rebutted Bradbury on its website, defending its position of protecting coral reefs despite continued human impacts causing reef declines.

In a pair of studies published in 2015, extrapolation from observed extinction of Hawaiian snails of the family Amastridae, led to the conclusion that "the biodiversity crisis is real", and that 7% of all species on Earth may have disappeared already. Human predation was noted as being unique in the history of life on Earth as being a globally distributed 'superpredator', with predation of the adults of other apex predators and with widespread impact on food webs worldwide. A study published in May 2017 in Proceedings of the National Academy of Sciences noted that a "biological annihilation" akin to a sixth mass extinction event is underway as a result of anthropogenic causes. The study suggested that as much as 50% of animal individuals that once lived on Earth are already extinct. A different study published in PNAS in May 2018 says that since the dawn of human civilization, 83% of wild mammals have disappeared. Today, livestock makes up 60% of the biomass of all mammals on earth, followed by humans (36%) and wild mammals (4%). According to the 2019 Global Assessment Report on Biodiversity and Ecosystem Services by IPBES, 25% of plant and animal species are threatened with extinction. According to the World Wildlife Fund's 2020 Living Planet Report, 68% of wildlife populations have declined between 1970 and 2016 as a result of overconsumption, population growth and intensive farming, and the report asserts that "the findings are clear. Our relationship with nature is broken." However, a 2020 study, by Leung et al. including Maria Dornelas, disputed the findings of the Living Planet Report, finding that the 68% decline number was being influenced down by a very small amount extreme outliers and when these were not included, the decline was less steep, or even stable if other outliers were not included. A 2021 paper published in Frontiers in Conservation Science, which cites both of the aforementioned studies, says "population sizes of vertebrate species that have been monitored across years have declined by an average of 68% over the last five decades, with certain population clusters in extreme decline, thus presaging the imminent extinction of their species." According to the 2021 Economics of Biodiversity review, written by Partha Dasgupta and published by the UK government, "biodiversity is declining faster than at any time in human history." A 2022 scientific review published in Biological Reviews confirms that an anthropogenic sixth mass extinction event is currently underway. A 2022 study published in Frontiers in Ecology and the Environment, which surveyed more than 3,000 experts, states that the extinction crisis could be worse than previously thought, and estimates that roughly 30% of species "have been globally threatened or driven extinct since the year 1500."

Biogeography and nocturnality

Studies of urban evolution give an indication of how species may respond to stressors such as temperature change and toxicity.  Species display varying abilities to respond to altered environments through both phenotypic plasticity and genetic evolution. Researchers have documented the movement of many species into regions formerly too cold for them, often at rates faster than initially expected.

Permanent changes in the distribution of organisms from human influence will become identifiable in the geologic record.  This has occurred in part as a result of changing climate, but also in response to farming and fishing, and to the accidental introduction of non-native species to new areas through global travel. The ecosystem of the entire Black Sea may have changed during the last 2000 years as a result of nutrient and silica input from eroding deforested lands along the Danube River.

Researchers have found that the growth of the human population and expansion of human activity has resulted in many species of animals that are normally active during the day, such as elephants, tigers and boars, becoming nocturnal to avoid contact with humans, who are largely diurnal.

Climate

One geological symptom resulting from human activity is increasing atmospheric carbon dioxide content. During the glacial–interglacial cycles of the past million years, natural processes have varied  by approximately 100 ppm (from 180 ppm to 280 ppm) , anthropogenic net emissions of  have increased atmospheric concentration by a comparable amount: From 280 ppm (Holocene or pre-industrial "equilibrium") to approximately 400 ppm, with 2015–2016 monthly monitoring data of  displaying a rising trend above 400 ppm. This signal in the Earth's climate system is especially significant because it is occurring much faster, and to a greater extent, than previous, similar changes. Most of this increase is due to the combustion of fossil fuels such as coal, oil, and gas, although smaller fractions result from cement production and from land-use changes (such as deforestation).

Geomorphology
Changes in drainage patterns traceable to human activity will persist over geologic time in large parts of the continents where the geologic regime is erosional. This involves, for example, the paths of roads and highways defined by their grading and drainage control. Direct changes to the form of the Earth's surface by human activities (quarrying and landscaping, for example) also record human impacts.

It has been suggested that the deposition of calthemite formations exemplify a natural process which has not previously occurred prior to the human modification of the Earth's surface, and which therefore represents a unique process of the Anthropocene. Calthemite is a secondary deposit, derived from concrete, lime, mortar or other calcareous material outside the cave environment. Calthemites grow on or under man-made structures (including mines and tunnels) and mimic the shapes and forms of cave speleothems, such as stalactites, stalagmites, flowstone etc.

Stratigraphy

Sedimentological record
Human activities like deforestation and road construction are believed to have elevated average total sediment fluxes across the Earth's surface. However, construction of dams on many rivers around the world means the rates of sediment deposition in any given place do not always appear to increase in the Anthropocene. For instance, many river deltas around the world are actually currently starved of sediment by such dams, and are subsiding and failing to keep up with sea level rise, rather than growing.

Fossil record
Increases in erosion due to farming and other operations will be reflected by changes in sediment composition and increases in deposition rates elsewhere. In land areas with a depositional regime, engineered structures will tend to be buried and preserved, along with litter and debris. Litter and debris thrown from boats or carried by rivers and creeks will accumulate in the marine environment, particularly in coastal areas, but also in mid-ocean garbage patches. Such human-created artifacts preserved in stratigraphy are known as "technofossils".

Changes in biodiversity will also be reflected in the fossil record, as will species introductions.  An example cited is the domestic chicken, originally the red junglefowl Gallus gallus, native to south-east Asia but has since become the world's most common bird through human breeding and consumption, with over 60 billion consumed annually and whose bones would become fossilised in landfill sites. Hence, landfills are important resources to find "technofossils".

Trace elements
In terms of trace elements, there are distinct signatures left by modern societies. For example, in the Upper Fremont Glacier in Wyoming, there is a layer of chlorine present in ice cores from 1960's atomic weapon testing programs, as well as a layer of mercury associated with coal plants in the 1980s.

From the late 1940s, nuclear tests have led to local nuclear fallout and severe contamination of test sites both on land and in the surrounding marine environment. Some of the radionuclides that were released during the tests are Cs, Sr, Pu, Pu, Am, and I. These have been found to have had significant impact on the environment and on human beings. In particular, Cs and Sr have been found to have been released into the marine environment and led to bioaccumulation over a period through food chain cycles. The carbon isotope C, commonly released during nuclear tests, has also been found to be integrated into the atmospheric CO, and infiltrating the biosphere, through ocean-atmosphere gas exchange. Increase in thyroid cancer rates around the world is also surmised to be correlated with increasing proportions of the I radionuclide.

The highest global concentration of radionuclides was estimated to have been in 1965, one of the dates which has been proposed as a possible benchmark for the start of the formally defined Anthropocene.

Human burning of fossil fuels has also left distinctly elevated concentrations of black carbon, inorganic ash, and spherical carbonaceous particles in recent sediments across the world. Concentrations of these components increases markedly and almost simultaneously around the world beginning around 1950.

Temporal limit

"Early anthropocene" model 

William Ruddiman has argued that the Anthropocene began approximately 8,000 years ago with the development of farming and sedentary cultures. At that point, humans were dispersed across all continents except Antarctica, and the Neolithic Revolution was ongoing. During this period, humans developed agriculture and animal husbandry to supplement or replace hunter-gatherer subsistence. Such innovations were followed by a wave of extinctions, beginning with large mammals and terrestrial birds. This wave was driven by both the direct activity of humans (e.g. hunting) and the indirect consequences of land-use change for agriculture. Landscape-scale burning by prehistoric hunter-gathers may have been an additional early source of anthropogenic atmospheric carbon. Ruddiman also claims that the greenhouse gas emissions in-part responsible for the Anthropocene began 8,000 years ago when ancient farmers cleared forests to grow crops.

Ruddiman's work has been challenged with data from an earlier interglaciation ("Stage 11", approximately 400,000 years ago) which suggests that 16,000 more years must elapse before the current Holocene interglaciation comes to an end, and thus the early anthropogenic hypothesis is invalid. Also, the argument that "something" is needed to explain the differences in the Holocene is challenged by more recent research showing that all interglacials are different.

Scholars have also disputed Ruddiman's claim that the land change and greenhouse gas emissions caused by Neolithic farming practices account for a large enough systems change to denote new epochal designation. These scholars claim that an early date for the proposed Anthropocene term does not account for a substantial human footprint on Earth. Others have argued that the Early Anthropocene Hypothesis only provides a cursory view of Native American farming practices prior to European colonization, which did not result in the same land change or greenhouse gas emissions as European and Asian agriculture of the same period. They argue that if precolonial Native American farming was studied in relation to European and Asian agriculture of the same period, the European colonization of the Americas would be seen as the epoch's starting point.

European colonization of the Americas 
Professor of Earth System Science Mark Maslin and Professor of Global Change Science Simon L. Lewis argue that the start of the Anthropocene should be dated to the Orbis Spike, a trough in carbon dioxide levels associated with the arrival of Europeans in the Americas.  Reaching a minimum around 1610, global carbon dioxide levels were depressed below 285 parts per million, largely as a result of sequestration due to forest regrowth in the Americas.  This was likely caused by indigenous peoples abandoning farmland following a sharp population decline due to initial contact with European diseases – around 50 million people or 90% of the indigenous population may have succumbed. For Maslin and Lewis, the Orbis Spike represents a GSSP, a kind of marker used to define the start of a new geological period.  They also go on to say that associating the Anthropocene to European arrival in the Americas makes sense given that the continent's colonization was instrumental in the development of global trade networks and the capitalist economy, which played a significant role in initiating the Industrial Revolution and the Great Acceleration.

A number of other anthropologists, geographers, and postcolonial, settler colonial, and Indigenous theorists, including Métis anthropologist Zoe Todd and Potawatomi philosopher Kyle Powys Whyte have also linked the Anthropocene to the rise of European colonialism. Because of these arguments, it has been suggested that the epoch should instead be called "The Kleptocene" to call "attention to colonialism's ongoing theft of land, lives (both human and nonhuman), and materials" that are "in large part responsible for contemporary ecological crisis."

Industrial Revolution
Crutzen proposed the Industrial Revolution as the start of Anthropocene. Lovelock proposes that the Anthropocene began with the first application of the Newcomen atmospheric engine in 1712. The Intergovernmental Panel on Climate Change takes the pre-industrial era (chosen as the year 1750) as the baseline related to changes in long-lived, well mixed greenhouse gases. Although it is apparent that the Industrial Revolution ushered in an unprecedented global human impact on the planet, much of Earth's landscape already had been profoundly modified by human activities. The human impact on Earth has grown progressively, with few substantial slowdowns.

Great Acceleration 
In May 2019 the twenty-nine members of the Anthropocene Working Group (AWG) proposed a start date for the Epoch in the mid-twentieth century, as that period saw "a rapidly rising human population accelerated the pace of industrial production, the use of agricultural chemicals and other human activities. At the same time, the first atomic-bomb blasts littered the globe with radioactive debris that became embedded in sediments and glacial ice, becoming part of the geologic record." The official start-dates, according to the panel, would coincide with either the radionuclides released into the atmosphere from bomb detonations in 1945, or with the Limited Nuclear Test Ban Treaty of 1963.

Anthropocene markers 
A marker that accounts for a substantial global impact of humans on the total environment, comparable in scale to those associated with significant perturbations of the geological past, is needed in place of minor changes in atmosphere composition.

A useful candidate for holding markers in the geologic time record is the pedosphere. Soils retain information about their climatic and geochemical history with features lasting for centuries or millennia. Human activity is now firmly established as the sixth factor of soil formation. Humanity affects pedogenesis directly by, for example, land levelling, trenching and embankment building, landscape scale control of fire by early humans, organic matter enrichment from additions of manure or other waste, organic matter impoverishment due to continued cultivation and compaction from overgrazing. Human activity also affects pedogenesis indirectly by drift of eroded materials or pollutants. Anthropogenic soils are those markedly affected by human activities, such as repeated ploughing, the addition of fertilisers, contamination, sealing, or enrichment with artefacts (in the World Reference Base for Soil Resources they are classified as Anthrosols and Technosols). An example from archaeology would be dark earth phenomena when long-term human habitation enriches the soil with black carbon.

Anthropogenic soils are recalcitrant repositories of artefacts and properties that testify to the dominance of the human impact, and hence appear to be reliable markers for the Anthropocene. Some anthropogenic soils may be viewed as the 'golden spikes' of geologists (Global Boundary Stratotype Section and Point), which are locations where there are strata successions with clear evidences of a worldwide event, including the appearance of distinctive fossils. Drilling for fossil fuels has also created holes and tubes which are expected to be detectable for millions of years. The astrobiologist David Grinspoon has proposed that the site of the Apollo 11 Lunar landing, with the disturbances and artifacts that are so uniquely characteristic of our species' technological activity and which will survive over geological time spans could be considered as the 'golden spike' of the Anthropocene.

An October 2020 study coordinated by University of Colorado at Boulder found that distinct physical, chemical and biological changes to Earth's rock layers began around the year 1950. The research revealed that since about 1950, humans have doubled the amount of fixed nitrogen on the planet through industrial production for agriculture, created a hole in the ozone layer through the industrial scale release of chlorofluorocarbons (CFCs), released enough greenhouse gasses from fossil fuels to cause planetary level climate change, created tens of thousands of synthetic mineral-like compounds that do not naturally occur on Earth, and caused almost one-fifth of river sediment worldwide to no longer reach the ocean due to dams, reservoirs and diversions. Humans have produced so many millions of tons of plastic each year since the early 1950s that microplastics are "forming a near-ubiquitous and unambiguous marker of Anthropocene". The study highlights a strong correlation between global human population size and growth, global productivity and global energy use and that the "extraordinary outburst of consumption and productivity demonstrates how the Earth System has departed from its Holocene state since ~1950 CE, forcing abrupt physical, chemical and biological changes to the Earth's stratigraphic record that can be used to justify the proposal for naming a new epoch—the Anthropocene."

A December 2020 study published in Nature found that the total anthropogenic mass, or human-made materials, outweighs all the biomass on earth, and highlighted that "this quantification of the human enterprise gives a mass-based quantitative and symbolic characterization of the human-induced epoch of the Anthropocene."

In culture

Humanities
The concept of the Anthropocene has also been approached via humanities such as philosophy, literature and art. In the scholarly world, it has been the subject of increasing attention through special journals, conferences, and disciplinary reports. The Anthropocene, its attendant timescale, and ecological implications prompt questions about death and the end of civilisation, memory and archives, the scope and methods of humanistic inquiry, and emotional responses to the "end of nature". Some scholars have posited that the realities of the Anthropocene, including "human-induced biodiversity loss, exponential increases in per-capita resource consumption, and global climate change," have made the goal of environmental sustainability largely unattainable and obsolete.

Historians have actively engaged the Anthropocene. In 2000, the same year that Paul Crutzen coined the term, world historian John McNeill published Something New Under the Sun, tracing the rise of human societies' unprecedented impact on the planet in the twentieth century. In 2001, historian of science Naomi Oreskes revealed the systematic efforts to undermine trust in climate change science and went on to detail the corporate interests delaying action on the environmental challenge. Both McNeill and Oreskes became members of the Anthropocene Working Group because of their work correlating human activities and planetary transformation.

In 2009, Dipesh Chakrabarty pointed to the dilemma that the Anthropocene poses for the practice of history: On the one hand, it spells "the collapse of the age-old humanist distinction between natural history and human history" yet, on the other, societies and individuals do not experience themselves as a "species". In 2014, Julia Adeney Thomas highlighted problems of scale and value as the reasons for this irresolvable tension between human stories and scientific ones. Since 2007, historians and scientists have been actively collaborating on multidisciplinary approaches to the Anthropocene. Together with the Rachel Carson Center for Environment and Society (RCC), the Deutsches Museum (Munich, Germany) hosted a major special exhibition on the Anthropocene from December 2014 – September 2016, "Welcome to the Anthropocene: The Earth in our hands", which was then digitized as a  virtual exhibition on the RCC's Environment & Society Portal. In 2016, historians Christophe Bonneuil and Jean Baptiste-Fressoz published The Shock of the Anthropocene: The Earth, History and Us in an attempt to provide "the first critical history of the Anthropocene" through engagement with the history of science, world history, and human development.

As anthropogenic ecological crises and environmental disasters increase, so too do emotional responses to these issues. The emotional responses are inherently adaptive and with appropriate support can lead to action and collective support. Evidence suggests that increase in reflective functioning and capacity for emotional processing can support the emotional responses through crisis, leading to stronger societal responses and individual resilience. Some scholars have posited that the realities of the Anthropocene, including "human-induced biodiversity loss, exponential increases in per-capita resource consumption, and global climate change," have made the goal of environmental sustainability largely unattainable and obsolete.

Debates

Although the validity of "Anthropocene" as a scientific term remains disputed, its underlying premise, i.e., that humans have become a geological force, or rather, the dominant force shaping the Earth's climate, has found traction among academics and the public. In an opinion piece for Philosophical Transactions of the Royal Society B, Rodolfo Dirzo, Gerardo Ceballos, and Paul R. Ehrlich write that the term is "increasingly penetrating the lexicon of not only the academic socio-sphere, but also society more generally", and is now included as an entry in the Oxford English Dictionary. The University of Cambridge, as another example, offers a degree in Anthropocene Studies. In the public sphere, the term "Anthropocene"  has become increasingly ubiquitous in activist, pundit, and political discourses. Some who are critical of the term "Anthropocene" nevertheless concede that "For all its problems, [it] carries power." The popularity and currency of the word has led scholars to label the term a "charismatic meta-category" or "charismatic mega-concept." The term, regardless, has been subject to a variety of criticisms from social scientists, philosophers, Indigenous scholars, and others.

The anthropologist John Hartigan has argued that due its status as a charismatic meta-category, the term "Anthropocene" marginalizes competing, but less visible, concepts such as that of "multispecies." The more salient charge is that the ready acceptance of "Anthropocene" is due to its conceptual proximity to the status quo – that is, to notions of human individuality and centrality. Whereas the concept of "multispecies" decenters these notions by viewing the "human" as a species "entangled in copious folds of nonhumans, without which we would not exist" — e.g., bacteria, viruses, and fungi – the conceptual framework embedded in the term "Anthropocene," according to Hartigan, does not challenge anthropocentric humanism nor species individualism, ideologies which he takes to have enabled the climate crisis in the first place. The scholar Mark Bould has similarly criticized "Anthropocene" as a concept. The enormous temporal scale of the Anthropocene, Bould argues, potentially yields politically detrimental outcomes. More specifically, if the climate crisis is figured into the timeframe of a geological epoch, as opposed to decades, it might impede the sense of urgency needed to build the political will to act on the climate crisis. As Bould writes: "talking about a geological epoch invites awestruck recoil at sublime magnitudes, which is not necessarily a bad thing, since hubris should be clobbered once in a while, but also risks evasion and complacency."

Other scholars appreciate the way in which the term "Anthropocene" recognizes humanity as a geological force, but take issue with the indiscriminate way in which it does. Not all humans are equally responsible for the climate crisis. To that end, scholars such as the feminist theorist Donna Haraway and sociologist Jason Moore, have suggested naming the Epoch instead as the "Capitalocene." Such implies capitalism as the fundamental reason for the ecological crisis, rather than just humans in general. However, according to philosopher Steven Best, humans have created "hierarchical and growth-addicted societies" and have demonstrated "ecocidal proclivities" long before the emergence of capitalism. Hartigan, Bould, and Haraway all critique what "Anthropocene" does as a term; however, Hartigan and Bould differ from Haraway in that they criticize the utility or validity of a geological framing of the climate crisis, whereas Haraway embraces it.

In addition to "Capitalocene," other terms have also been proposed by scholars to trace the roots of the Epoch to causes other than the human species broadly. Janae Davis, for example, has suggested the "Plantationocene" as a more appropriate term to call attention to the role that plantation agriculture has played in the formation of the Epoch, alongside Kathryn Yusoff's argument that racism as a whole is foundational to the Epoch. The Plantationocene concept traces "the ways that plantation logics organize modern economies, environments, bodies, and social relations." In a similar vein, Indigenous studies scholars such as Métis geographer Zoe Todd have argued that the Epoch must be dated back to the colonization of the Americas, as this "names the problem of colonialism as responsible for contemporary environmental crisis." Potawatomi philosopher Kyle Powys Whyte has further argued that the Anthropocene has been apparent to Indigenous peoples in the Americas since the inception of colonialism because of "colonialism's role in environmental change."

Other critiques of "Anthropocene" have focused on the genealogy of the concept. Todd also provides a phenomenological account, which draws on the work of the philosopher Sara Ahmed, writing: "When discourses and responses to the Anthropocene are being generated within institutions and disciplines which are embedded in broader systems that act as de facto 'white public space,' the academy and its power dynamics must be challenged." Other aspects which constitute current understandings of the concept of the "Anthropocene" such as the ontological split between nature and society, the assumption of the centrality and individuality of the human, and the framing of environmental discourse in largely scientific terms have been criticized by scholars as concepts rooted in colonialism and which reinforce systems of postcolonial domination. To that end, Todd makes the case that the concept of "Anthropocene" must be indigenized and decolonized if it is to become a vehicle of justice as opposed to white thought and domination.

The scholar Daniel Wildcat, a Yuchi member of the Muscogee Nation of Oklahoma, for example, has emphasized spiritual connection to the land as a crucial tenet for any ecological movement. Similarly, in her study of the Ladakhi people in northern India, the anthropologist Karine Gagné, detailed their understanding of the relation between nonhuman and human agency as one that is deeply intimate and mutual. For the Ladakhi, the nonhuman alters the epistemic, ethical, and affective development of humans – it provides a way of "being in the world." The Ladakhi, who live in the Himalayas, for example, have seen the retreat of the glaciers not just as a physical loss, but also as the loss of entities which generate knowledge, compel ethical reflections, and foster intimacy. Other scholars have similarly emphasized the need to return to notions of relatedness and interdependence with nature. The writer Jenny Odell has written about what Robin Wall Kimmerer calls "species loneliness," the loneliness which occurs from the separation of the human and the nonhuman, and the anthropologist Radhika Govindrajan has theorized on the ethics of care, or relatedness, which govern relations between humans and animals. Scholars are divided on whether to do away with the term "Anthropocene" or co-opt it.

Popular culture
 The concept gained attention of the public via documentary films such as The Antarctica Challenge: A Global Warning, The Polar Explorer, L'homme a mangé la Terre, Anthropocene: The Human Epoch and Anthropocene.
 David Grinspoon makes a further distinction in the Anthropocene, namely the "proto-Anthropocene" and "mature Anthropocene". He also mentions the term "Terra Sapiens", or Wise Earth.
 In 2019, the English musician Nick Mulvey released a music video on YouTube named "In The Anthropocene". In cooperation with Sharp's Brewery, the song was recorded on 105 vinyl records made of washed-up plastic from the Cornish coast.
 The Anthropocene Reviewed is a podcast and book by author John Green, where he "reviews different facets of the human-centered planet on a five-star scale". 
 In 2015, the American death metal band Cattle Decapitation released its seventh studio album titled The Anthropocene Extinction.
 In 2020, the artist Grimes released an album titled Miss Anthropocene.
 In 2022, Amitav Ghosh wrote a fable The Living Mountain: a fable of our times wherein he deals with the genre he calls Anthropocene.

See also 

 Anthropocentrism
 Anthropogenic biomes
 Climate engineering
 Control of fire by early humans
 Defaunation
 Ecocriticism
 Future Earth international research programme
 Geobiology
 Great Transition
 Holocene extinction
 Human overpopulation
 Hypoxia (environmental)
 International Geosphere-Biosphere Programme
 Meghalayan
 Novel ecosystem
 Overconsumption
 Planetary boundaries
 Plastic pollution
 Power Down: Options and Actions for a Post-Carbon World

References

Further reading

 Bonneuil, Christophe; Fressoz, Jean-Baptiste.(2016) The Shock of the Anthropocene. The Earth, History and Us, Verso Books. Translated by David Fernbach. Originally published as L’événement Anthropocène: La terre, l’histoire et nous. Le Seuil 2013
 
 
 
 
 
 
Emmett, Robert, Thomas Lekan, eds. "Whose Anthropocene? Revisiting Dipesh Chakrabarty's ‘Four Theses,’" RCC Perspectives: Transformations in Environment and Society 2016, no. 2. doi.org/10.5282/rcc/7421.
 
 
 
 Kim, Rakhyun E. (2021). "Taming Gaia 2.0: Earth System Law in the Ruptured Anthropocene". The Anthropocene Review. https://doi.org/10.1177/20530196211026721
 
 
 
 
Purdy, Jedediah. (2015). "Anthropocene Fever". Aeon. pp. 1–9.
 
 
 
 
 
 
 
 
 Thomas, Julia Adeney, Jan Zalasiewicz, "Strata and Three Stories." RCC Perspectives: Transformations in Environment and Society 2020, no. 3. doi.org/10.5282/rcc/9205.
 Trischler, Helmuth, ed. "Anthropocene: Exploring the Future of the Age of Humans," RCC Perspectives 2013, no 3. doi.org/10.5282/rcc/5603.
 
 
Klinkenborg, Verlyn (December 2016). What's Happening to the Bees and Butterflies? New York Review of Books
 Vanishing: The Sixth Mass Extinction, and How to stop the sixth mass extinction (December 2016), CNN.
 
'Ozymandias in the Anthropocene: the city as an emerging landform', Dixon S., et al. (2017) AREA, Royal Geographical Society

External links

"Have humans created a new geological age?" , New Scientist, 24 January 2008
Videos of a Radcliffe conference on Biodiversity in the Anthropocene, 10 March 2006
"Debate over the Early Anthropogenic Hypothesis", RealClimate, December 2005
"Earth Is Us", Dot Earth blog, New York Times, 28 January 2008
Recent work on the Early Anthropocene Hypothesis presented at AGU, December 2008
 Thierry Picquet, "New era in the evolution of the world", Planétarisation
Humanity Blamed for 9,000 Years of Global Warming
Nothing new under the sun: Anthropogenic global warming started when people began farming, The Economist review; includes nice graphic showing the rise in methane (a greenhouse gas), from agricultural slash-and-burn started 8,000 years ago.
How Did Humans First Alter Global Climate?, Scientific American, 2005
Methane: A Scientific Journey from Obscurity to Climate Super-Stardom NASA
Anthropocene: Have humans created a new geological age? BBC News, 11 May 2011

The Anthropocene epoch: have we entered a new phase of planetary history?, The Guardian, 2019
 Tooze, Adam, "Whose century?", London Review of Books, vol. 42, no. 15 (30 July 2020), pp. 9–13. Tooze closes (p. 13): "Can [the US] fashion a domestic political bargain to enable the US to become what it currently is not: a competent and co-operative partner in the management of the collective risks of the Anthropocene.  This is what the Green New Deal promised. After the shock of COVID-19 it is more urgent than ever."
 The forgotten environmental crisis: how 20th century settler writers foreshadowed the Anthropocene. The Conversation. 3 December 2020.
 Drawing A Line In The Mud: Scientists Debate When 'Age Of Humans' Began. NPR. 17 March 2021.
 8 billion humans: How population growth and climate change are connected as the ‘Anthropocene engine’ transforms the planet. The Conversation. 3 November 2022.

Holocene
Human impact on the environment
Human ecology
1960s neologisms
Events in the geological history of Earth